The Traveler Buttress is a technical rock climbing on Lover's Leap route near Tahoe, California, USA, and is featured in Fifty Classic Climbs of North America.

References

External links 
summitpost.org
supertopo
rockclimbing.com
mountainproject.com

Climbing routes